Färjestad or Färjestaden may refer to:
Färjestad BK, Swedish professional ice hockey club
Färjestads Ishall, ice hockey arena in Karlstad, Sweden
Färjestaden, locality in Mörbylånga Municipality, Sweden
Färjestadens GoIF, Swedish football club
Färjestadens IBK, Swedish floorball club